Lev A.C. Rosen, also known as L.C. Rosen, is an American author.

Biography 
Rosen was raised in Manhattan, New York, where he still lives today with his husband and their cat, Waterloo. He attended a private high school and came out as gay when he was around 13 years old. In 2006, Rosen received a Master of Fine Arts degree in fiction from Sarah Lawrence College.

When he was younger, Rosen attended a Jewish summer camp in Connecticut for several years, the physical layout of which is represented in his novel Camp. Later, he was a counsellor at the camp and was forbidden to mention his sexuality with any of the children.

Selected texts

Jack of Hearts (2018) 
Jack of Hearts (and Other Parts) is a young adult novel published October 30, 2018 by Little, Brown Books for Young Readers. The book follows Jack, a gay teenager who is the center of gossip at his high school. After he starts writing an advice column in his friend's blog, he begins receiving messages from a stalker, making his life worse.

The book was generally well received by critics with Gay Times saying it "might be the most important queer novel of the decade." Kirkus Reviews called the book a "sex-positive and thoughtful romp with humor and heart," while Booklist referred to it as "[f]resh, sex-positive, and unabashedly entertaining." The Guardian wrote, "Part thriller, part down-to-earth guide, this is humane, sex-positive writing of the funniest, filthiest and most heartening kind." School Library Journal said the book is an “essential addition to library collections that serve teens."

Although the book wasn't explicitly banned in the United States, Rosen has stated it was "silent[ly] banned" because teachers, schools, and library did not place the book on shelves. On November 4, 2021, the book was permanently removed from circulation from Texas's Keller Independent School District after a parental complaint. On November 15, a parent from Texas's Katy Independent School District used the book as an example to highlight the "vulgarity" of books available in the district's libraries. The district removed Jack of Hearts from shelves the following day. Rosen has responded to the book challenges saying the passages are taken out of context. He further stated that "[a]ll of the questions answered in Jack’s advice column were submitted by real students" and he "consulted with sex education experts to write Jack’s responses, with the goal of providing LGBTQ teens with practical information that’s often omitted from sex ed classes."

Camp (2020) 

Camp is a young adult novel published by May 26, 2020, by Little, Brown Books for Young Readers. The book tells the story of Randall Kapplehoff, a gay teen who goes every year to a queer summer camp and is finally ready to start a relationship with his crush.

Publishers Weekly called the book a "fun, inclusive story that's sex-, romance-, and LGBTQ-positive," while Kirkus Reviews said, "This novel has the appeal of a rom-com movie-makeover but with more substantive explorations." Booklist noted Rosen's attempt to tackle issues present in the LGBT community, such as internal biases and prejudices, ultimately calling the book "[a]n essential pick for teens figuring out who and how to love."

The book is currently being adapted into a film directed by and starring Billy Porter.

Awards and honors 
The Guardian named Jack of Hearts (and Other Hearts) one of the Best Books of the Year.

In 2020, Camp was named one of the best books of the year by ALMA Magazine, Booklist, Elle, The Guardian, the Today Show, and School Library Journal.

Publications

Novels

Adult 

 All Men of Genius (2011)
 Depth (2015)
 Lavender House (2022)

Middle grade 

 Woundabout, illustrated by Ellis Rosen (2015)
 The Memory Wall (2016)

Young adult 

 Jack of Hearts (and Other Parts) (2018)
 Camp (2020)
 Tennessee Russo (expected 2023)

Short stories 

 “Another Word: It Gets Better with SFF (but SFF has to Get Better, too)” in Clarkesworld Magazine, Issue 74 (2012)

References

External links 

 Official website

Sarah Lawrence College alumni
American LGBT writers
Writers from Manhattan
21st-century American writers
LGBT people from New York (state)